Miwa (みわ, ミワ) is a feminine Japanese given name which can also be used as a surname.

Possible writings
Miwa can be written using different kanji characters and can mean:
三和 "three, harmony"
三輪 "three, wheel/ring"
美和 "beauty, harmony"
美羽 "beauty, feather"
美輪 "beauty, wheel/ring"
美環 "beauty, ring; circle; loop"
The given name can also be written in hiragana or katakana.

People
with the given name Miwa
 Miwa (singer) (born 1990), a musician who sung the theme song for the drama Nakanai to Kimeta Hi
 Miwa Asao (美和, born 1986), a beach volleyball player
 Miwa Fukuhara (美和, born 1944), a figure skater
, Japanese women's basketball player
 Miwa Matsumoto (美和, born 1971), a voice actress
 Miwa Nishikawa (美和, born 1974), a director
 Miwa Oshiro (大城 美和, born 1983), gravure idol, model and actress
, Japanese cross-country skier
 Miwa Ueda (美和, 21st century), a manga artist
 Miwa Yasuda (美和, born 1977), a voice actress
 Miwa Yoshida (美和, born 1965), lead singer of the band Dreams Come True
 Miwa Takada (美和, born 1947), an actress

with the surname Miwa
 Akihiro Miwa (美輪, born 1935), a singer, actor, and theatre director
, Japanese actress
 Sadahiro Miwa (三輪 定広, born 1941), Olympic weightlifter
 Shigeyoshi Miwa (三輪, born 1892), an admiral in the Imperial Japanese Navy
 Shirow Miwa (三輪, born 1978), a manga artist
, Japanese racewalker
 Takashi Miwa (三輪, born 1969), a former professional baseball player
 Teppei Miwa (三輪 哲平, born 2000), Japanese artistic gymnast
 Tetsuji Miwa (三輪 哲二,, born 1949), Japanese mathematician
 Tetsuya Miwa (三輪), the guitarist of the rock band Spitz

Fictional characters
with the given name Miwa
Miwa Hamato, a recurring character in the 2012 of Teenage Mutant Ninja Turtles. She is the biological daughter of Hamato Yoshi and the late Tang Shen, but was abducted by the Shredder as an infant and was renamed Karai.
Miwa Tamashiro (美和), a character in the anime series Kotetsushin Jeeg
Miwa Isono, a character in the manga series MPD Psycho
Miwa Kageyama (美羽), the sister of Tobio Kageyama from the anime and manga series Haikyū!!
With the surname Miwa
Satoshi Miwa (三輪), a character in the manga and anime Marmalade Boy
Sakamori Miwa (三輪), a character in the anime series Tōshō Daimos
Ichigen Miwa (三輪 一言), a character in the anime series K
Shinobu Miwa (三輪), a character in the anime, manga, and novel series RahXephon
Konekomaru Miwa (三輪), a character in Blue Exorcist

Japanese feminine given names
Japanese-language surnames